Badrinath or Badrinarayana Temple is a Hindu temple dedicated to Vishnu. It is situated in the town of Badrinath in Uttarakhand, India. The temple is also one of the 108 Divya Desams dedicated to Vishnu - holy shrines for Vaishnavas - who is worshipped as Badrinath. It is open for six months every year (between the end of April and the beginning of November), because of extreme weather conditions in the Himalayan region. The temple is located in Garhwal hill tracks in Chamoli district along the banks of Alaknanda River. It is one of the most visited pilgrimage centers of India, having recorded 2.8 million (28 lakh) visits in just 2 months in 2022. It is one of the Char Dham pilgrimage sites.

The deity is considered by many Hindus to be one of eight svayam vyakta kshetras, or self-manifested deities of Vishnu.

Mata Murti Ka Mela, which commemorates the descent of river Ganges on mother earth, is the most prominent festival celebrated in the Badrinath Temple. Although Badrinath is located in North India, the head priest, or Rawal, is traditionally a Nambudiri Brahmin chosen from the South Indian state of Kerala. The temple was included in the Uttar Pradesh state government Act No. 30/1948 as Act no. 16,1939, which later came to be known as Shri Badarinath and Shri Kedarnath Mandir Act. The committee nominated by the state government administers both the temples and has seventeen members on its board.

The temple is mentioned in ancient religious texts like Vishnu Purana and Skanda Purana. It is glorified in the Naalayira Divya Prabandham, an early medieval Tamil canon of the Alvar saints from the 6th–9th centuries CE.

Location, architecture, and shrines

The temple is located in Garhwal hill tracts along the banks of the Alaknanda River in Chamoli district in Uttarakhand. The Nar Parbat mountain is located opposite to the temple, while the Narayana Parbat is located behind the Neelkanth peak.

Adi Shankara established Badrinath as a pilgrimage site in the ninth century. The temple has three structures: the Garbhagriha (sanctum), the Darshan Mandapa (worship hall), and Sabha Mandapa (convention hall). The facade is built of stone and has arched windows. A broad stairway leads up to the main entrance, a tall, arched gateway. Just inside is a mandap, a large, pillared hall that leads to the sanctum, or main shrine area. The walls and pillars of the hall are covered with intricate carvings.

The main shrine houses the  Shaligram (black stone) deity of Badrinarayana, which is housed in a gold canopy under a Badri Tree. The deity of Badrinarayana shows Him holding a Shankha (conch) and a Chakra (wheel) in two of His arms in a lifted posture and the other two arms resting on His lap in a Yogamudra (Padmasana) posture. The sanctum also houses images of the god of wealthKubera, sage Narada, Uddhava, Nara and Narayana. There are fifteen more images that are also worshipped around the temple. These include that of Lakshmi (the consort of Vishnu), Garuda (the vahana of Narayan), and Navadurga, the manifestation of Durga in nine different forms. The temple also has shrines of Lakshmi Narasimhar and for saints Adi Shankara (CE 788-820), Nar and Narayan, Ghantakarna, Vedanta Desika  and Ramanujacharya. All the deities of the temple are made of black stone.

The Tapt Kund, a group of hot sulphur springs just below the temple, are considered to be medicinal; many pilgrims consider it a requirement to bathe in the springs before visiting the temple. The two water ponds in the temple are called Narad Kund and Surya Kund.

History

There is no historical record about the temple, but there is a mention of the presiding deity Badrinath in Vedic scriptures (–500 BCE).  According to some accounts, the shrine was worshipped in some form in the Vedic period. The architecture of the temple resembling that of a Buddhist vihara (temple) and the brightly painted facade which is atypical of Buddhist temples leads to the argument. Other accounts relate that it was originally established as a pilgrimage site by Adi Shankara in the ninth century. It is believed that Shankara resided in the place for six years from CE 814 to 820. He resided six months in Badrinath and the rest of the year in Kedarnath. Hindu followers assert that he discovered the deity of Badrinath in the Alaknanda River and enshrined it in a cave near the Tapt Kund hot springs. A traditional story asserts that Shankara expelled all the Buddhists in the region with the help of the Parmar ruler king Kanak Pal, however this might be fictitious and very recent. The hereditary successors of the king governed the temple and endowed villages to meet its expenses. The income from a set of villages on the route to the temple was used to feed and accommodate pilgrims. The Parmar rulers held the title "Bolanda Badrinath", meaning speaking Badrinath. They had other titles, including Shri 108 Basdrishcharyaparayan Garharaj Mahimahendra, Dharmabibhab, and Dharamarakshak Sigamani.

The throne of Badrinath was named after the presiding deity; the king enjoyed ritual obeisance by the devotees before proceeding to the shrine. The practice was continued until the late 19th century. During the 16th century, the King of Garhwal moved the murti to the present temple. When the state of Garhwal was divided, the Badrinath temple came under British rule but the king of Garhwal continued as the chairman of the management committee. The selection of priest is done after consultation between Garhwal and Travancore royal families.

The temple has undergone several major renovations due to its age and damage by an avalanche. In the 17th century, the temple was expanded by the Kings of Garhwal. After significant damage during the great 1803 Garhwal earthquake, it was largely rebuilt by the King of Jaipur. It was still under renovation as late as the 1870s but these were completed by the time of the First World War. At that time, the town was still small, consisting of only the 20-odd huts housing the temple's staff, but the number of pilgrims was usually between seven and ten thousand. The Kumbha Mela festival held every twelve years raised the number of visitors to 50,000. The temple also enjoyed revenue from the rents owed to it by various villages bequeathed by various rajas.

During 2006, the state government announced the area around Badrinath as a no construction zone to curb illegal encroachment.

Legend

According to Hindu legend, the god Vishnu sat in meditation at this place. During his meditation, Vishnu was unaware of cold weather. Lakshmi, his consort, protected him in the form of the Badri tree (jujube or Indian date, called 'ber' in Hindi). Pleased by the devotion of Lakshmi, Vishnu named the place Badrika Ashrama. According to Atkinson (1979), the place used to be a jujube forest, which is not found there today. Vishnu in the form of Badrinatha is depicted in the temple sitting in the padmasana posture. According to the legend, Vishnu was chastised by sage Narada, who saw Vishnu's consort, Lakshmi, massaging his feet. Vishnu went to Badrinath to perform austerity, meditating for a long time in padmasana.

The Vishnu Purana narrates another version of the origins of Badrinath. According to the tradition, Yama had two sons, Nara, and Narayanaboth of which are modern names of Himalayan mountains. They chose the place to spread their religion and each of them wed the spacious valleys in the Himalayas. Searching for an ideal place to set up a hermitage, they came across the other four Badris of the Pancha Badri, namely Bridha Badri, Yoga Badri, Dhyana Badri and Bhavisha Badri. They finally found the hot and cold spring behind the Alaknanda River and named it  "Badri Vishala."

Literature
The temple finds mention in several ancient books like Bhagavata Purana, Skanda Purana and Mahabharata. According to the Bhagavata Purana, "[t]here in Badrikashram the Personality of Godhead (Vishnu), in his incarnation as the sages Nar and Narayana, had been undergoing great penance since time immemorial for the welfare of all living entities". The Skanda Purana states that "[t]here are several sacred shrines in heaven, on earth, and in hell; but there is no shrine like Badrinath". The area around Badrinath is also celebrated in Padma Purana as abounding in spiritual treasures. The Mahabharata revered the holy place as the one which can give salvation to devotees arriving close to if, while in other holy places they must perform religious ceremonies. The temple is revered in Naalayira Divya Prabandham, in 11 hymns in the 7th–9th century Vaishnava canon by Perialvar and in 13 hymns by Thirumangai Alvar. It is one of the 108 Divya Desam dedicated to Vishnu, who is worshipped as Badrinath. The temple is referred as Tiruvatariyaacciraamam in Tamil literature.

Pilgrimage
Devotees of all faiths and all schools of thought of Hinduism visit the Badrinath Temple. All the major monastic institutions like Kashi Math, Jeeyar Mutt (Andhra mutt), Udupi Pejavar and Manthralayam Sri Raghavendra Swamy Mutts have their branches and guest houses there.

The Badrinath temple is one of five related shrines called Panch Badri, which are dedicated to the worship of Vishnu. The temple is considered one of the holiest Hindu Char Dham (four divine) sites, comprising Rameswaram, Badrinath, Puri and Dwarka. Although the temple's origins are not clearly known, the Advaita school of Hinduism established by Adi Shankara attributes the origin of Char Dham to the seer. The four monasteries are located across the four corners of India and their attendant temples are Badrinath Temple at Badrinath in the North, Jagannath Temple at Puri in the East, Dwarakadheesh Temple at Dwarka in the West and Rameshwaram at Rameshwaram, Tamil Nadu in the South.

Though ideologically the temples are divided between the sects of Hinduism, namely Saivism and Vaishnavism, the Char Dham pilgrimage is an all-Hindu affair. There are four abodes in the Himalayas called Chota Char Dham (Chota meaning small): Badrinath, Kedarnath, Gangotri and Yamunotriall of which lie in the foothills of the Himalayas. The name Chota was added during the mid of 20th century to differentiate the original Char Dhams. As the number of pilgrims to these places has increased in modern times, it is called Himalayan Char Dham.

The journey across the four cardinal points in India is considered sacred by Hindus, who aspire to visit these temples once in their lifetimes. Traditionally, the pilgrimage starts at the eastern end from Puri, proceeding clockwise in a manner typically followed for circumambulation in Hindu temples.

Festivals and religious practices

The most prominent festival held at Badrinath Temple is Mata Murti Ka Mela, which commemorates the descent of the river Ganges on mother earth. The mother of Badrinath, who is believed to have divided the river into twelve channels for the welfare of earthly beings, is worshiped during the festival. The place where the river flowed became the holy land of Badrinath.

The Badri Kedar festival is celebrated during the month of June in both the temple and the Kedarnath temple. The festival lasts for eight days; artists from all over the country perform during the function.

The major religious activities (or pujas) performed every morning are mahabhishek (ablution), abhishek, gitapath and bhagavat puja, while in the evening the pujas include geet govinda and aarti. Recital in vedic scripts like Ashtotram and Sahasranama is practised during all the rituals. After aarti, the decorations are removed from the image of Badrinath and sandalwood paste is applied to it. The paste from the image is given to the devotees the next day as prasad during the nirmalaya darshan. All the rituals are performed in front of the devotees, unlike those in some Hindu temples, where some practices are hidden from them. Sugar balls and dry leaves are the common prasad provided to the devotees. From May 2006, the practise of offering Panchamrit Prasad, prepared locally and packed in local bamboo baskets, was started.

The temple is closed for winter on the auspicious day of bhatridwityia or later during October–November. On the day of closure, Akhanda Jyothi, a lamp is lit filled with ghee to last for six months. Special pujas are performed on the day by the chief priest in the presence of pilgrims and officials of the temple. The temple is reopened around April–May on Akshaya tritiya, another auspicious day on the Hindu calendar. Pilgrims gather on the first day of opening of the temple after the winter to witness the Akhanda Jyothi.

The temple is one of the holy places where the Hindus offer oblations to ancestors with the help of the priests. Devotees visit the temple to worship in front of the image of Badrinath in the sanctum and have a holy dip in Alaknanda River. The general belief is that a dip in the tank purifies the soul.

Administration and visit

The Badrinath Temple was included in the Uttar Pradesh State Government Act No. 30/1948 as Act no. 16,1939, which was later known as Shri Badarinath and Shri Kedarnath Mandir Act. A committee nominated by the State Government of Uttarakhand administers both the temples. The act was modified in 2002 to appoint additional committee members, including government officials and a Vice-Chairman. There are seventeen members in the board; three selected by the Uttarakhand Legislative Assembly, one member each selected by the District Councils of Chamoli Pauri Garhwal, Tehri Garhwal and Uttarkashi districts, and ten members nominated by the Government of Uttarakhand.

As indicated in the temple records, the priests of the temple were Shiva ascetics called Dandi Sanyasis, who belonged to Nambudiri community, a religious group common in modern Kerala. When the last of the ascetics died without an heir in 1776 CE, the King of Garhwal invited non-ascetic Nambudiris from Kerala for the priesthood, a practice that continues in modern times. Till 1939, all the offerings made by the devotees to the temple went to the Rawal (Chief Priest), but after 1939, his jurisdiction was restricted to religious affairs. The administrative structure of the temple consists of a chief executive officer who executes the orders from the state government, a deputy chief executive officer, two OSDs, an executive officer, an account officer, a temple officer, and a public officer to assist the chief executive officer.

Although Badrinath is located in North India, the head priest, or Rawal, is traditionally a Nambudiri Brahmin chosen from the South Indian state of Kerala. This tradition is believed to have been initiated by Adi Shankara, who was a South Indian philosopher. The Rawal is requested by the Government of Uttarakhand to the Government of Kerala. The candidate should possess a degree of Acharya (Post Graduate) in Sanskrit, be a bachelor, well-versed in reciting mantras (sacred texts) and be from the Vaishnava sect of Hinduism. The erstwhile ruler of Garhwal, who is the tutelary head of Badrinath, approves the candidate sent by the Government of Kerala. A Tilak Ceremony is held to instate the Rawal and he is deputed from April to November when the temple remains open. The Rawal is accorded his holiness status by the Garhwal Rifles and the state government of Uttarakhand. He is also held in high esteem by the Royals of Nepal. From April to November, he performs his duties as a temple priest. Thereafter, he either stays in Jyotirmath or returns to his native village in Kerala. The duties of the Rawal starts at 4 a.m. every day with the Abhisheka. He should not cross the river until Vamana Dwadashi and must adhere to Brahmacharya. The Rawal is assisted by the Garhwali Dimri Brahmins belonging to the village Dimmar of Chamoli district, Naib Rawal, Dharmadikari, Vedpathi, a group of priests, Pandas Samadhi, Bhandari, Rasoiyas (cook), devotional singer, clerk of devashram, Jal Bhariya (water keeper) and temple guards. Badrinath is one of the few temples in North India that follow the ancient Tantra Vidhi of Shrauta tradition more common in the south.

In 2012, the temple administration introduced a token system for visitors to the temple. Tokens indicating the time of visit were provided from three stalls in the taxi stands. Each devotee to visit the presiding deity is allocated 10–20 seconds. Proof of identity is mandatory to enter the temple. From Kedarnath Temple, visitors can follow the -long Rudraprayag route or the -long Ukhimath and Gopeshwar route.

See also 
 Rameshwaram
 Divya Desams
 Religious tourism in India

References

Bibliography

Further reading

External links

 Official website
 

Divya Desams
Char Dham temples
Chamoli district
Vaishnavism
Vishnu temples
Uttarakhand
Hindu pilgrimages
Hindu pilgrimage sites
Hindu pilgrimage sites in India
Religious tourism in India